Bdebba  بدبا  is a village in Koura District of Lebanon. It has a  Maronite  and Greek Orthodox population.

Etymology 
The word Bdebba has Syriac origins and is formed of two parts “Bet Dibba”. “Bet” means “house”(مكان ) and “Dibba”  means “bear” (الدب). Hence, Bdebba is the house of the bear(مأوى الدب).
This etymological analysis can be supported by archeological finding in the area. Indeed, an excavation by a team from Tokyo University Scientific Expedition to Western Asia in the Keoue area, a river bed that separates Bdebba and Bterram, and the artifacts found led to the conclusion that the occupants of the site were probably big bear hunters using small points.

Location 

The town extends over an area of approximately 462 acres, (²)most of the land is planted with olive trees.

Coordinates 

34° 20' 53" North

35° 49' 11" East

Population 

The estimated number of registered residents reaches around 1,200 people, with the majority (more than 80%) belonging to the Greek Orthodox church and a minority of Maronite Catholics.

The number of voters reached 859 in 2004, compared with 872 in 2000.

Families 

According to the 2004 municipal elections these are the most influential families in Bdebba:

 Khoury: 150 voters
 Daher: 72 voters
 Jabbour: 60 voters
 Saadeh: 50 voters
 Jreige: 50 voters
 Chikhani: 43 voters
 Moussa: 35 voters
 Abi Saab: 30 voters
 Nehmeh: 30 voters
 Armesh: 25 voters
 Sleiman: 20 voters
 Barakat: 20 voters

Other families include: Hajj, Nassar, Ibrahim, Chakkour, Youssef, Fayyad, Qormesh, Ya’acoub, Tannous, Merched, Itani, Ghazi, Razzouk, Maik, Gerges, Derkhashadorian, Allawi, Tarraq, Boustani, and Sassine.

Local authorities 

Until 2004 the highest authority in town was the mukhtar (mayor); headed by Lila Khoury and the vice Mayor Georgette Khoury.

Since 2004 municipality was created in Bdebba in line with decision no. 818 of December 30, 2003. The municipal council is formed of 9 members and is headed by Zafer Khoury. The town still has a mukhtar (mayor) and a mayoral council.

Economy 

Residents depend on the cultivation of olive, production of olive oil and olive soap, some cultivate fig, grapes, grapefruits, mostly for personal consumption.

Also the immigrants to the United States of America, Canada, Argentina, Brazil, Mexico, Africa, Saudi Arabia, Kuwait and the other Gulf states send money to their families.

Archeological and cultural sites 

Bdebba have ruins that date back to the Phoenician period. Those include ancient caves and sarcophagi. Ruins from the Crusades era were also discovered in the town.

There are also two Greek Orthodox churches and a monastery.

Education 

There are no schools in Bdebba, elementary school students go to nearby towns, some students seeking a college degree go to United States or Europe.

There is almost no illiteracy, most residents also speak, French and/or English, and/ or Spanish.

References

External links
Bdebba, Localiban

Maronite Christian communities in Lebanon
Eastern Orthodox Christian communities in Lebanon
Populated places in the North Governorate
Koura District